Belomitra is a genus of sea snails, marine gastropod mollusks in the family Belomitridae.

Species
Species within the genus Belomitra include:
 Belomitra admete Kantor, Puillandre, Rivasseau & Bouchet, 2012
 Belomitra aikeni (Lussi, 2011)
 Belomitra aoteana (Dell, 1956)
 Belomitra bouteti Kantor, Puillandre, Rivasseau & Bouchet, 2012
 Belomitra brachymitra Kantor, Puillandre, Rivasseau & Bouchet, 2012
 Belomitra brachytoma (Schepman, 1913)
 Belomitra caudata Kantor, Puillandre, Rivasseau & Bouchet, 2012
 Belomitra challengeri (E. A. Smith, 1891)
 Belomitra chasmata (Dall, 1927)
 Belomitra christina (Dall, 1927)
 Belomitra climacella (Dall, 1895)
 Belomitra comitas Kantor, Puillandre, Rivasseau & Bouchet, 2012
 Belomitra decapitata Kantor, Puillandre, Rivasseau & Bouchet, 2012
 Belomitra granulata Kantor, Puillandre, Rivasseau & Bouchet, 2012
 Belomitra gymnobela Kantor, Puillandre, Rivasseau & Bouchet, 2012
 Belomitra hypsomitra Kantor, Puillandre, Rivasseau & Bouchet, 2012
 Belomitra leobrerorum Poppe & Tagaro, 2010
 Belomitra minutula Kantor, Puillandre, Rivasseau & Bouchet, 2012
 Belomitra nesiotica Kantor, Puillandre, Rivasseau & Bouchet, 2012
 Belomitra pacifica (Dall, 1908)
 Belomitra paschalis (Thiele, 1925)
 Belomitra pourtalesii (Dall, 1881)
 Belomitra problematica (Thiele, 1925)
 Belomitra quadruplex (Watson, 1882)
 Belomitra radula Kantor, Puillandre, Rivasseau & Bouchet, 2012
 Belomitra reticulata Kantor, Puillandre, Rivasseau & Bouchet, 2012
 Belomitra richardi (Dautzenberg & Fischer, 1906)
 Belomitra subula Kantor, Puillandre, Rivasseau & Bouchet, 2012
 Belomitra torquata (Barnard, 1963)
 Belomitra viridis (Okutani, 1966)
Species brought into synonymy
 Belomitra fischeri Locard, 1897: synonym of Belomitra quadruplex (R. B. Watson, 1882)
 Belomitra lyrata Locard, 1897: synonym of Belomitra quadruplex (R. B. Watson, 1882)
 Belomitra paradoxa P. Fischer, 1883: synonym of Belomitra quadruplex (R. B. Watson, 1882)
 Belomitra spelta Locard, 1897: synonym of Belomitra quadruplex (R. B. Watson, 1882)

References

 Bouchet P. & Warén A. (1985). Revision of the Northeast Atlantic bathyal and abyssal Neogastropoda excluding Turridae (Mollusca, Gastropoda). Bollettino Malacologico Suppl. 1: 121-296
 Beu A.G. (1970). Bathyal Upper Miocene Mollusca from Wairarapa District, New Zealand. Transactions of the Royal Society of New Zealand, Earth Sciences. 7(12): 209-240

External links
 Fischer P. (1882-1883). Diagnoses d'espèces nouvelles de mollusques recueillis dans le cours des expéditions scientifiques de l'aviso "Le Travailleur" (1880 et 1881). Journal de Conchyliologie 30: 49-53 [1882, 273-277]
  Kantor Yu.I., Puillandre N., Rivasseau A. & Bouchet P. (2012) Neither a buccinid nor a turrid: A new family of deep-sea snails for Belomitra P. Fischer, 1883 (Mollusca, Neogastropoda), with a review of Recent Indo-Pacific species. Zootaxa 3496: 1–64
  Kantor Yu.I., Puillandre N., Rivasseau A. & Bouchet P. (2012) Neither a buccinid nor a turrid: A new family of deep-sea snails for Belomitra P. Fischer, 1883 (Mollusca, Neogastropoda), with a review of Recent Indo-Pacific species. Zootaxa 3496: 1–64

Belomitridae
Gastropod genera